Venstre had held the mayor's position in Glostrup Municipality since 2010.

In the 2017 election, Venstre won 7 seats, and John Engelhardt would become mayor for his third term. 

Depsite this, Mandag Morgen, a newspaper, expected the Social Democrats would take over the mayor's position following this election. One of the reasons they said for this was that 4 parties outside Venstre had agreed on a financial settlement for 2022 in the period up to the election.  Apart from this, John Engelhardt had also announced in November 2020 that he would not stand for a fourth term.

In the election result, the Social Democrats would become the largest party with 8 seats, followed by Venstre who lost 2 seats and ended on 5. An agreement with the Danish Social Liberal Party, the Conservatives and the Green Left was eventually reached by the Social Democrats, and this would see Kasper Damsgaard become the first mayor from the Social Democrats since 2009.

Electoral system
For elections to Danish municipalities, a number varying from 9 to 31 are chosen to be elected to the municipal council. The seats are then allocated using the D'Hondt method and a closed list proportional representation.
Glostrup Municipality had 19 seats in 2021

Unlike in Danish General Elections, in elections to municipal councils, electoral alliances are allowed.

Electoral alliances  

Electoral Alliance 1

Electoral Alliance 2

Electoral Alliance 3

Electoral Alliance 4

Results

Notes

References 

Glostrup